Edison International is a public utility holding company based in Rosemead, California.  Its subsidiaries include Southern California Edison, and unregulated non-utility business assets Edison Energy.  Edison's roots trace back to Holt & Knupps, a company founded in 1886 as a provider of street lights in Visalia, California.

History
The company was first incorporated in 1909 as Southern California Edison Company after Southern California acquired the assets of Edison Electric Company; it was known as Southern California Edison until 1996, when it adopted its current name in recognition of its growing business abroad and in other industry sectors.  Edison first became a holding company in 1988 when it made a small change to its original name, becoming known as SCEcorp.

Edison International acquired the naming rights for the Los Angeles Angels' stadium (previously known as Anaheim Stadium) in 1998, in a deal running for 20 years. The company backed out of the naming rights deal after the 2003 season, and the stadium is now called Angel Stadium.

In 2001, Edison's main holding, Southern California Edison, faced bankruptcy after a state senate bill regarding financial assistance came up short by $1 billion.

On August 6, 2002, Edison International recorded core earnings per share of 56 cents in the second quarter of 2002.

Recent moves
In November 2010 Edison sold its 48% interest in the Four Corners coal-fired power plant in New Mexico (units 4 and 5; units 1, 2 and 3 were scheduled to close due to their age) for $294 million to Pinnacle West Capital Corp (of Arizona Public Service).  The move was the direct result of a new California law requiring utility companies to exit coal-fired power production (even the renewing of contracts is disallowed), and forces Edison to purchase more power from the market.

San Onofre Nuclear Generating Station
Unit 2 shut in early January 2012 for refueling and replacement of the reactor vessel head.
Both reactors at San Onofre have been shut since January 2012 due to premature wear found on tubes in massive steam generators installed in 2010 and 2011.

In April 2012, in a sign of mounting concern over the shutdown, the top U.S. nuclear official, Gregory Jaczko, toured the facility with Senator Dianne Feinstein, a Democrat, and U.S. Representative Darrell Issa, a Republican. In June, 2013, the company announced it would permanently shut down operations at the plant, the beginning of a multi-year decommissioning process at the site.

Energy production mix
At least 46% of the fuel Southern California Edison uses to generate power comes from clean energy (6% of that nuclear power, the others renewable energy sources ranging from biomass to wind).  The group is a major player in Southern California where it provides 13 million people with electricity.

Southern California Edison began to focus on renewable energy in 1980.

References

External links

Electric power companies of the United States
Southern California Edison
Energy in California
Holding companies of the United States
Companies based in Los Angeles County, California
Rosemead, California
Energy companies established in 1886
1886 establishments in California
Companies in the Dow Jones Utility Average
Companies listed on the New York Stock Exchange